Automatic Man was an American rock band from San Francisco.  Consisting of well-respected musicians of diverse backgrounds within the rock, funk and jazz communities of the mid-1970s, Automatic Man played progressive rock and space rock.

Despite a well-reviewed 1976 eponymous début on Island Records and a lone charting single, 1976's "My Pearl", which reached No. 97 on the Billboard Hot 100., the line-up of Automatic Man was not cohesive. After a second album entitled Visitors, they disbanded in 1977, retaining a small but very loyal, global cult following.

With both releases being reissued on CD in 2004 after 28 years of only being available in vinyl format and with the advent of the internet, Automatic Man are being rediscovered and roundly praised for their genre-defying, boundary-breaking musical sound and unique lyrics.

Formation
Automatic Man formed in San Francisco around 1975 when drummer Michael Shrieve decided to quit Santana to explore other musical avenues. That led him to work with ex-Traffic/Spencer Davis group singer/keyboardist Steve Winwood, percussionist Stomu Yamashta, and synthesizer player Klaus Schulze on the Go album, an album of experimental progressive rock that had been released by Island Records a year later. Pat Thrall was approached by Michael Shrieve in 1975 to audition for a band he was forming with Todd Cochran.

Cochran, then known under the alias of "Bayete" (pronounced Bye-yet-tay), was a child prodigy and formally trained keyboard player who had attended the Trinity College of Music in England as a teen. Cochran had already been part of the jazz scene for nearly a decade, playing with renowned jazz artists Bobby Hutcherson and Julian Priester. He also released two jazz-funk solo albums on Prestige Records in 1972 and 1973. Completing the lineup was bass guitarist Doni Harvey, who performed around the SF/Bay Area with his brothers and in blues, jazz, and soul bands, playing both bass and guitar. According to Harvey's brother, Regi Harvey, Doni joined the band sheerly by chance,

During the break we heard a band practising in the big space. We went in to see who it was. It turned out to be "Automatic Man". That night the bass man wasn't working out and stomped out of the room. They spotted Don and asked him to sit in and to finish rehearsing. He stepped up to the plate that night. When they stopped for a break we went back in the small space we were practising in to finish. During that time they asked him to join the band. One of the reasons was that he played so well that they were that impressed. The other was that Doni and I had gone to Junior College with the keyboard player and main writer "Bayete" at the newly opened "Skyline College".

Impressing Chris Blackwell, president of Island Records, he signed the band to a two-record deal.

Debut album
Rather than continue to build on their following in the San Francisco/Bay Area, Automatic Man headed for London. Automatic Man made Chelsea's King's Road in London their base of operations recording at Basing Street Studios now Sarm West Studios in Notting Hill and the legendary Olympic Studios with renowned recording engineer Keith Harwood. The self-titled debut album featured hard guitars and layered synthesizers. Allusions to space travel, Atlantis, astral projection, karma, angels, aliens, belly dancers and other mystical and exotic subjects are covered on nearly every album track. Cochran wrote the tracks "Atlantis Rising-Fanfare", "Coming Through", "One and One", "Newspapers", "Geni-Geni" and "Turning of the Axis [Theme from Atlantis Rising]". He shares co-writing credits with band manager Lou CasaBianca on "Automatic Man", "Interstellar Tracking Devices" and "Right Back Down." The entire band and CasaBianca share writing credits on "There's A Way."

Track listing 
All songs written and composed by Todd Cochran (as "Bayete"), except as noted.
Side one
 "Atlantis Rising-Fanfare" – 1:37
 "Comin' Through" – 3:35
 "My Pearl" – 3:34 (Automatic Man)
 "One and One" – 5:57
 "Newspapers" – 3:57
 "Geni Geni" – 5:32
Side two
 "Right Back Down" – 5:55 (Bayete/CasaBianca)
 "There's a Way" - 5:14 (Automatic Man/CasaBianca)
 "I.T.D. (Interstellar Tracking Devices)" – 5:14 (Bayete/CasaBianca)
 "Automatic Man" – 3:55 (Bayete/CasaBianca)
 "Atlantis Rising Theme (Turning of the Axis)" – 3:16

(My Pearl was released with a B-side entitled "Wallflower")

Personnel on Automatic Man
 Pat Thrall - guitar, vocals; lead vocals on "Geni-Geni", "There's a Way" and "Automatic Man"
 Todd Cochran - keyboards, vocals; lead vocals on "Comin' Through", "My Pearl", "One and One", "Newspapers", "Right Back Down", "There's a Way", "I.T.D. Interstellar Tracking Devices"
 Doni Harvey - bass guitar, vocals; lead vocals on "There's a Way" and "Automatic Man"
 Michael Shrieve - drums
Produced by Automatic Man and Lou CasaBianca
Mixed by Keith Harwood and Chris Kimsey

Album art
Painted by Bay Area artist Dwain Zerio (1950–1995), both front covers of each Automatic Man album feature a simple luminously painted blue alienlike face staring out from space. This 'alien' face was meant to be representative of a human without a body, with just the spiritual energy or 'aura' providing the visual shape. The debut album is blue on blue, while the follow-up features the blue face on a shocking pink and magenta background. The inside liner art of the first album includes the blue face with Egyptian wings, floating above a pyramid, rising Atlantis-like out of a raging ocean with a maelstrom in the background. The artwork for the "My Pearl" single featured a woman's face suspended over a misty crevasse crowned with wings and a self-consuming serpentine rainbow.

The art work for both Automatic Man LP covers was entirely original, and one of the first times (possibly THE first) that an alien face had been depicted in a mass market medium; it bears more than a passing resemblance to the alien face which would be seen on countless bumperstickers and decals from the early 1990s onward. 

In the United Kingdom, the album was championed on BBC Radio 1 by Alan Freeman, who provided a voiceover for adverts for the album transmitted on the UK's commercial radio stations.

Original lineup dissolves
After their album debut, Automatic Man promoted the disc with appearances at a number of European music festivals including the prestigious Montreux Jazz Festival in Switzerland. According to a later interview with Thrall, the band had trouble pulling off their material live. Part of the problem was that the technology of the era was too difficult to use live. Shrieve too would also recall that the band had not had enough chances to play live.

The band was also feted by fellow artists and luminaries of the day including the Rolling Stones and Hunter S Thompson who wrote a concert review. Though they would make a few more live appearances in their original Bay Area stomping grounds, infighting, clashes over music and disagreements over how the bands finances were being directed, this led to Automatic Man's first line-up dissolving after returning to the United States in 1976.

Visitors

The second Automatic Man album was entitled Visitors and released in 1977 with a more accessible sound than their debut. Bayeté solely wrote each track. Guitarist Pat Thrall was still a member but Shrieve and Harvey were now replaced by bassist Jerome Rimson (also from the "Go" project) and drummer Glenn Symmonds. Originally from Detroit, Rimson played bass on the track "Man from Manhattan" which features on the album Ghost of a Smile with a pre-Queen Freddie Mercury on piano and vocals, and Brian May on Guitar. From 1974 he had been musical director for Van Morrison, playing on several tours and in 1976, he played on the Al Jarreau's Grammy winning jazz album Glow. Glenn Symmonds had been Eddie Money's drummer since 1974, departing to record and tour with ex-Santana percussionist Coke Escovedo.

Personnel on Visitors 
 Pat Thrall - Guitar, vocals
 Todd Cochrane - Keyboards, vocals
 Glenn Symmonds - Drums
 Jerome Rimson - Bass
Produced by Michael Lloyd
Lionel Conway - executive producer
Bruce Robb - engineer
Lou CasaBianca/Glyphics - art direction & album design

Track listing 
All songs written and composed by Todd Cochran as "Bayete".
Side one
 "Give it to me" - 3:49
 "Live Wire" - 4:45
 "So You Wanna Be Me" – 4:00
 "Y-2-Me" – 4:18

Side two
 "Visitors" – 3:50
 "Here I Am Now" – 5:14
 "There's a Way" -4:26
 "Daughter of Neptune" – 4:13
 "What's Done" – 6:22

Critical reception to Visitors
Fans of the band did not receive the second album as warmly. Music reviewer Doug Watson's description is that Visitors is "just a mediocre shot at mesh funk-rock, although arguably ahead of its time in predicting the ghastly and overblown rock guitar productions of the 80s." However, the record collector's website Progrography declared,

... Visitors isn't a concept album. It's also not the commercial sellout that some have mistakenly branded it. Like the music of Santana, Automatic Man was on a quasi-mystical quest that relied on the conventional language of funk/rock but also rode beyond those borders in pursuit of a grander statement. It's probably on that last point that prog fans have hung their hat, but Visitors is not a progressive rock album. Bayete's bid to be a rock star ended with the Automatic Man albums, leaving behind two impressive albums that bespeak the transitional phase between jazz, disco and ambitious (if not progressive) rock as well as any records from the period.

Band breakup
Partially due to no longer having the name recognition of Shrieve, the album failed to make waves in the music press and Automatic Man permanently disbanded in 1977.

Afterward
All four members of the original Automatic Man line up became prolific and well respected solo and session musicians with Shrieve and Cochran emerging as sought after composers and arrangers. Lou CasaBianca, the band's manager and co-producer for the first disc, moved into video production and media technology writing. Glenn Symmonds and Jerome Rimson, drummer and bassist on Visitors respectively, continued on in the music industry to steady work and success as well, with Rimson writing an autobiography. There has, to date, been no talk of a possible Automatic Man reunion.

Michael Shrieve
After leaving Automatic Man, Shrieve continued to be one of the most sought after drummers in the music world. His credits number well into the hundreds and include work on Pete Townshend's 1981 disc, All the Best Cowboys Have Chinese Eyes and for artists Mick Jagger, The Rolling Stones, George Harrison, Steve Winwood, Police guitarist Andy Summers, film composer Mark Isham, Freddie Hubbard, Jaco Pastorius, Wayne Horvitz, Bill Frisell, Zakir Hussain, Airto Moreira and Amon Tobin. Michael Shrieve also composes music for film and television, working with Paul Mazursky on the film, Tempest and scored music for Curtis Hanson's The Bedroom Window. In the early 1980s, his power pop quartet, Novo Combo scored minor hits with the songs "Up Periscope" and "City Bound." A few years later (1983), Shrieve got involved with the power group HSAS, featuring Sammy Hagar, Neal Schon of Journey fame and former bass player from Derringer Kenny Aaronson. The group recorded the album "Through the Fire" and the single "A Whiter Shade of Pale", originally written and performed by Procol Harum, peaked at #94 in 1984.

Shrieve is also the past President of the Pacific Northwest Branch of the National Association of Recording Arts and Sciences (NARAS), and is currently writing the memoirs of jazz drumming legend Elvin Jones. He also serves as Musical Director for Seattle Theatre Group's "More Music at The Moore," a program that highlights gifted young musicians from Seattle's various cultural groups. In 1998, Shrieve was inducted into the Rock and Roll Hall of Fame with Santana. He also received the Guitar Center's first annual "Lifetime Achievement Award" in 2005.

Todd Cochran
Todd Cochran's career continued to see many radical musical shifts in direction as he wrote, produced, performed keyboards, guitar and/or synthesizer programming for a widely diverse number of artists including Aretha Franklin, Eminem, Maynard Ferguson, Juan Carlos Quintero, Stewart Copeland, Peter Gabriel and Grover Washington Jr in genres that included funk, new age, jazz disco and combinations thereof. He was a member of Fuse One, a coalition of jazz musicians who released two albums on CTI Records in 1980 and 1981. Since 2000, Cochran has been primarily establishing himself as a film composer, as well as re-engaging with classical composition which he had explored at the start of his musical career. His first full soundtrack was for Doug McHenry's TV movie "Keep the Faith, Baby" from 2002, a portrait of the black senator Adam Clayton Powell. In 2004 he composed the music for the critically acclaimed, "Woman Thou Art Loosed", an adaptation of Bishop T.D. Jakes' self-help novel, it won the Best Film Award at the "American Black Film Festival".
In 2006, Robert L. Watt, Assistant Principal French horn with the Los Angeles Philharmonic, commissioned Todd Cochran to write a musical composition in memory of Miles Davis. This resulted in a piece called "Missing Miles" – a suite for horn and piano. Film director Kim Bass made a thirteen-minute film, also called "Missing Miles", which chronicled the creation of the composition and a performance of the work. In the Feb 2007 issue of "Film Music Magazine" called "Ebony and Ivory: The Door Only Swings One Way", focused on how black composers often only get offered "black" films. In the article, Todd referenced the limitations placed on black composers by the entertainment world,

two people can go through the same training – the same schools – and reach the same level of ability, and as soon as they step out of the schools, (and come to Hollywood) one is a black composer, and the other is just a composer ... unfortunately the need for African American film composers to deconstruct the existing stereotypes of musical aesthetic limitations persists.

Pat Thrall
Thrall went on to work in the fusion field with musicians including Narada Michael Walden and Alphonso Johnson. In 1978, Thrall was chosen from seventy auditioning guitarists for the co-lead spot with Pat Travers. He recorded on three LPs with Travers: Heat in the Street, Go For What You Know and Crash and Burn. The latter LP featured the FM hit, "Snortin' Whiskey", which Thrall co-wrote with Travers. He won "Best New Guitar Player" in the 1980 Guitar Player Magazine readers poll. "In 1987 he recorded and toured with Bruce Springsteen guitarist and producer Little Steven Van Zandt. 1988 found Thrall touring with Jack Bruce of "Cream" fame.  Thrall later joined Asia, and played lead guitar for a resurgent Meat Loaf during the 1990s. He has also recorded with Beyoncé, Elton John, Tina Turner and Dave Stewart, to name a few. Thrall has also lent his talent and support behind causes such as Nelson Mandela's foundation to fight AIDS in Africa.

Thrall was nominated for a Grammy on Beyonce's "Crazy In Love".  He was also nominated for two Grammys on Frank Ocean's "Channel Orange" album.

Thrall's most acclaimed work, post-Travers, is undoubtedly the 'Hughes/Thrall' album from 1982, featuring Glenn Hughes on vocals and bass. A fusion of rock/synth/metal/pop, it is now considered a 'musician's favorite', going virtually unnoticed by the public at the time. Hughes and Thrall worked together on and off for the next 15 years, and planned on releasing 'Hughes/Thrall 2' in 2004, but Thrall's full-time work as a producer for other artists, and Hughes touring and recording schedule proved to be to much for them to complete the album.

Doni Harvey
Harvey went on to do session and live gigs in many different arenas both in Northern California and internationally, including playing on the film soundtrack of The Spy Who Loved Me and in his own power trio, HARVEY. His credits include backing Clarence Clemons and replacing Allan Holdsworth as the guitarist in Gong for a spell. In 1988, he joined the San Francisco-based World Music band, The Caribbean Allstars, as guitarist and backing vocalist. Harvey has been playing with the Caribbean Allstars for over two decades. He currently helms the group, "Doni Harvey and Deeper Shade of Blue" and together with fellow musicians Isis and Andy Jonson, formed The Unemployed Blues Band. Doni also became a permanent member of his brother's band Regi Harvey's Example, the latter of whom died on April, 25th, 2010.  Doni himself died on June 6, 2011.

Jerome Rimson
Rimson continued working steadily with Van Morrison until 1984 and still works with him intermittently. He played bass on The Sgt. Pepper's Lonely Hearts Club Band soundtrack for the notorious Bee Gees movie. He also collaborated extensively with Thin Lizzy's Phil Lynott and together they produced the first independent single ever released by a Dublin based band called Blue Russia, released on Vixen Records in Ireland in 1983. Rimson has played or sang on albums for Steve Winwood, Donovan, Topper Headon formerly of The Clash, Ron Roesing the drummer of the Smashing Pumpkins and many others. He now lives in Cork, Ireland teaching master classes on music production and theory. He has finished his autobiography, "Renegade" which he describes as his life experiences in "the biz" and the countless people he has met on his journey, including "...  Phil Lynott's last years, from rock n roll on the road to his life now in Ireland."

Glenn Symmonds
From his base in L.A. Symmonds continued to tour and record with many diverse musical groups including Steve Perry, John Klemmer, Elvin Bishop, Dave Mason, Duncan Sheik and Etta James. It was in 1986 while touring with The Untouchables he once again joined forces with Eddie Money and has been drumming for him for over two decades.  Now, based out of Nashville, Glenn Symmonds describe himself as a "...  Drummer, guitarist, singer, songwriter, teacher, father".

Remastered CD
In 2004, Cherry Red released, under their UK based Lemon subsidiary, a remastered version of Automatic Man to receptive music collectors. There has been controversy on the internet as to whether the original master tapes were used or not used by Lemon UK in the remastering process. Tom Karr of Progressive World gave the disc a five star rating in his review,

People have a strong desire, an urge, to categorize things, to put them in boxes. To place this with that and make order out of disorder. Music is one of those things we have to make sense of, to understand. How can some obscure band be so important? They are very, very good at what they do. This isn't a progressive rock band is it? Yes, they are, absolutely. If a visionary assemblage of influences and the power of moving music forward, are progressive, and for the purposes of this review, I will say it is, then this is fine progressive rock, indeed. And no, in the sense of Automatic Man fitting into a preconceived subgenre of progressive rock as understood now is concerned, then no, they are not a prog band, but they are much, much more than any label given them could describe. This San Francisco band had strong elements of spacey synthesizer driven progressive. Definitely. They could just as well be described as a hard rocking funk band as well. Both are true. Neither is accurate. No group I can think of so defies categorization as does Automatic Man.

Due to the overwhelming success of Automatic Man's re-release on Compact Disc, Lemon recordings also re-released, Visitors in 2005.

Discography

Albums
 Automatic Man (1976, Island Records US Chart Position No. 75)
 Visitors (1977, Island Records, US Chart Position No. 109)

U.S. chart singles
 "My Pearl" (1977, No. 97)

References

External links
 
 Automatic Man My Space page created by Doni Harvey's brother Regi Harvey
 "The Lives of Todd Cochran", an 11 chapter biography on Bayeté aka Todd Cochran with a section on Automatic Man
 Interview with Michael Shrieve discussing Automatic Man

Musical groups from San Francisco
Musical groups established in 1976
Progressive rock musical groups from California
Musical quartets
Rock music supergroups
Island Records artists
American space rock musical groups
African-American rock musical groups
1976 establishments in California